The GCC Champions League, is an annually organized football league tournament for club of the Arabian Peninsula.

The 2013 edition is the 28th edition and will feature clubs from Saudi Arabia for the first time since the 2009–10 Gulf Club Champions Cup.

Groups
Four groups of three teams.

Top two from each group qualify for the one legged quarter finals with group winners hosting the matches.

1 Al Hala replaced Al-Wasl after the group stage draw was completed.

Group stage

Group A

Group B

Group C

Group D

Quarter-finals

Semi-finals

First leg

Second leg

Final

First leg

Second leg

External links
2013 GCC Champions League at Goalzz.com

2012-13
2013 in Asian football